French Morocco had from 1912 to 1935 one of the largest  gauge network in Africa with a total length of more than .  After the treaty of Algeciras where the representatives of Great Powers agreed not to build any  standard-gauge railway in Morocco until the standard-gauge Tangier–Fes railway being completed, the French begun to build military  gauge lines in their part of Morocco French Morocco.

The 948 km Marrakech–Casablanca–Kenitra–Fes–Oujda line became known as Chemins de fer stratégiques du Maroc and the branch lines diverting from the line as Chemins de fer de pénétration du Maroc. These lines were mostly built during the period of 1921–1925, With the exception of Guercif–Outat Oulad el Hadj–Midelt, which was started in 1916 and completed in 1920.

Casablanca–Boussekoura–Berrechid line 
The first French-built narrow-gauge railway was the Casablanca–Bouskoura–Berrechid  line, built with portable railway track from Decauville, which also delivered the rolling stock to the line. Construction started in May 1908 and the 52 km line was completed in late July 1908. The trains reached a maximum speed of 20 km/h averaging only 12 km/h between Casablanca and Berrechid.

The locomotives which worked the 500 mm gauge line have not been yet been fully identified. Sources claim:
 3 Decauville,  / , Bt-n2, built in 1905, delivered new to Touzet, Senegal.
 3 Decauville,  / , B1t-n2, built in 1907, delivered to Raguet et Heurtematte, Paris.

Chemins de fer stratégiques du Maroc

Casablanca–Marrakech 
This  gauge line had a short life. It was completed around 1920, activities ceased in 1928.

Casablanca–Boussekoura–Berrechid 
This line formed the northern part of the Casablanca–Marrakech narrow-gauge line.

Berrechid–Dar Caïd Tounsi 
The Berrechid–Dar Caïd Tounsi (junction) section was completed in 1915 ( 109 km south of Casablanca).

Dar Caïd Tounsi–Marrakech 
The Dar Caïd Tounsi to Ben Guerir section was completed in September 1919. The final section from Ben Guerir to Marrakech was opened in September 1920.

Dar Caïd Tounsi–Mazagan branch 
Later also a branch line was built running from Dar Caïd Tounsi, which became a railway junction, to Mazagan (Harbour). This line was opened in early 1928.

Casablanca–Kenitra–Fes 
The French started also to build  gauge railway north of Casablanca. Rabat 89 km and Port Lyautey -now Kenitra- 128 km was reached in 1913. The opening dates of this line were:
 Casablanca–Fedala, March 1912, narrow gauge closed in April 1925.
 Fedala–Rabat, December 1912, narrow gauge closed in April 1925.
 Rabat–Kenitra, April 1913, narrow gauge closed in April 1923.
 Kenitra–Meknes, June 1914, narrow gauge closed in May 1923.
 Meknes–Fes, July 1915, narrow gauge closed in September 1923.

Oujda–Fes 
At Kenitra (Port Lyautey) the  "main line" turned towards east, the main target for the French military was a rail connection with their Algerian Railways at Oujda, where the French military had built from the Algerian side an 87 km  gauge line from Tlemcen via Marnia. This Chemin de Fer de Marnia a Taourirt was completed by 1911.

The 364 km line from Oujda to Fes was difficult to build. The railway had to go over a narrow passage between the Rif mountains in the north and the Atlas in the south. The railway line had to be built with steep gradients and sharp curves to reach – from both sides – the Touahar Pass.

East of Fes the narrow-gauge line followed the route Fes–Sidi Abdallah–Col de Touahar–Bab Marzouka–Taza–Kasba Msoun–Guercif (with branch to Midelt)–Chreia–Taourirt–El Aioun–Naima–Oujda.

Construction started simultaneously from both Fes and Oujda. When the  gauge line was completed, it was then possible to travel by train from Morocco to Algeria and Tunisia over the standard-gauge Chemins de fer l´Ouest Algerien

The French source gives opening dates for sections of Oujda–Fes line:
 Oujda–El Aioun, December 1912, narrow gauge closed in January 1932.
 El Aioun–Taourirt, April 1913, narrow gauge closed  in January 1932.
 Taourirt–Guercif, August 1913, narrow gauge closed in January 1932.
 Guercif–Taza, July 1915, narrow gauge closed in May 1933.
 Taza–Col de Touahar, July 1918, narrow gauge closed in May 1933.
 Col de Touahar–Sidi Abdallah, May 1918, narrow gauge closed in April 1934.
 Sidi Abdallah–Fes, July 1921, narrow gauge closed in April 1934.

Chemins de Fer de Penetration du Maroc

Berrechid–Oued Zem line 
During World War I the French built also a  gauge line from Berrechid to Oued Zem. This Berrechid–Ben Ahmed line was put to service in 1916 (narrow gauge closed in August 1923) and the Ben Ahmed–Oued Zem opened in August 1917 (narrow gauge closed in July 1925).

It was intended to continue the line from Oued Zem 44 km to Kasbah Tadla but this never materialised.

Dar Caid Tounssi–El Jadida 

As mentioned earlier, one penetration line from Dar Caïd Tounsi to El Jadida (Magazan) was built from the Casablanca–Marrakech line. This branch line, opened in early 1928 gave the shortest possible outlet to the Atlantic Ocean from Marrakech. But at El Jadida the port facilities were poor and primitive. 

When the standard-gauge railway from Machraa Ben Abbou to Marrakech was opened in July 1928 the  narrow-gauge line between Ben Guerir and Marrakech was closed.

Rabat–Tiflet–Khemisset 
The next penetration line was the 95 km Rabat–Tiflet–Khemisset  gauge line running east of Rabat. This line had only a local importance but it made it possible to move the local products as well as the
inhabitants in the morning train of the provincial capital to Rabat and their return during the same evening.

In addition a short branch line near Rabat was built from Bir–Tam–Tam to just built Abermoumou military garrison. This branch was completed in 1925.

There were in the early 1920s many local resistance against the French colonial administration in Morocco. Especially in the north, where Rif Cabyles rebels under leadership of Abd El-Krim, who did not recognise the Sultan's position as ruler of all Morocco and demanded an independent state for Cabyles. This led to open revolt in 1925–1926 against the French and Sultan of Morocco. By the time there were 325.000 French soldiers trying to pacify the Rif unrest and revolts in the French Zone of Morocco. World War I delayed the construction of the standard-gauge Chemin de Fer de Tanger a Fes. This, and the unrest in Rif area made the French to build a  gauge railways.

Kenitra–Mechra Bel Ksiri–Ain Dfali–Aïn Aïcha 
In 1922 first a railway line was built from Kenitra (Port Lyautey) to Mechra Bel Ksiri on the proposed Tanger–Fes Railway. This line was opened to traffic in 1923.

With this narrow-gauge railway the French transferred troops and supplies during the Rif rebellion.

In addition, after World War I the French extended the  gauge narrow-gauge railway into the heart of Rif region, from Mechra Bel Ksiri to Ain Dfali (junction). The line was further extended to Maarif and Aïn Aïcha.

The whole railway was closed by 1935, but its remnants were still visible in the 1950s.

Branch line Ain Dfali–Ouezzane 
At Ain Dfali the branch line was built via Dar Echchaouia to the city of Ouezzane.

Mechra Bel Ksiri to Ouezzane was opened in 1924 and Ain Dfali–Aïn Aïcha next year in 1925.

Chemin de Fer Guercif a Outat el Hadj et Midelt 
Perhaps the most famous and "mysterious" of the  gauge narrow-gauge railways in Morocco was the Chemin de Fer Guercif an Outat el Hadj et Midelt. It started from Fes–Oujda line and ran south-west along the Moulouya River valley near the east bank of the river course.  The whole railway line was: Guercif–Meski–Fritissa–Tissaf– Outat Oulad el Hadj. This section was completed and opened for military service during World War I in 1918.

The Outat Oulad el Hadj–Missour–Metlili–Midelt was completed in 1920.  The total length of the line was 280 km, 33 km longer than Casablanca–Marrakech main line.

There are several photographs showing trains and locomotives at Midelt railway station during the 1920s, and one official photograph with title " Midelt Gare " from 1920.

There were three limestone quarries around Midelt and later branch lines were built to the quarries, but little is known them because the whole line was closed by the end of 1935. ( One other source give the closing date 05.07.1936.) This line served many French Foreign Legion Forts. There were also many colonial troops from West Africa, mainly from French Soudan. Many of the soldiers had taken their wives with them to Morocco and they settled to station settlements along this railway line such as Midelt, Missour and Outat Oulad el Hadj. The trains were packed with French officers, Foreign Legioners, Senegalese soldiers and their women, local tradesmen, even some " blue men ", the Tuaregs, French business men from Algeria and Morocco and French administrative personnel. Really a cosmopolitan society of travellers, really unique in railway world of narrow-gauge lines. When the line was opened in 1920 the Midelt railway station was still 12 km away from Midelt in an empty valley without any settlement around it. Only later it was extended near to old town of Midelt.

Gallery

Others

Casablanca–Dar Bouazza 
To provide better travelling facilities for local population in Casablanca area the French Gouvernement Cherifien helped to build a new  gauge line from Casablanca (Port) along the Atlantic coast to Dar Bouazza and turn toward at Bou Haj el Mehdi to Foucauld. This local line was opened in 1923 and it served at least up to 1953. In Casablanca the section from Boulevard d´Anfa to Casablanca railway station was replaced by a trolleybus line.

Agadir to Auone 
Finally, there was in Morocco a little-known, totally isolated short 12 km  narrow-gauge line from Agadir to Auone. It was built after the Agadir Incident to strengthen the French military presence in Agadir. Nothing else is known of it. Remnants were still visible in the 1960s.

Locomotives delivered to French Morocco for 600 mm gauge lines 

Baldwin

 5 Baldwin, 2Ct-n2, built 1915, French Government f. Morocco No 101–106
 20 Baldwin, B-Bt-n4 type Pechot–Bourdon, built 1915–1916, French Army ( via Algeria )
 5 Baldwin, 2Ct-n2, built 1916, French Government f. Morocco No 107–111
 5 Baldwin, 2Ct-n2, built 1919, French High Commissar, Morocco No 112–116
 X Baldwin, B-gasoline mechanical , built 1917–1918, used mainly on Guercif–Midelt 280 km line.

Borsig

 1 Borsig, Ct-n2, built 1910, Soc. Anon.d.Ateliers de Constr. de Hal f. Casablanca, Maroc
 1 Borsig, Ct-n2, built 1912, Soc. Anon.d.ateliers de Constr. de Hal f. Casablanca, Maroc

Crochat

 5 Crochat, 1915? BB type 14L60 (DL), built 1915, Comp. des Ch. de. fer. du Maroc Oriental

Decauville

 2 Decauville, C1t-n2, built 1910–1911, Perchot, Casablanca, Maroc
 1 Decauville, C1t-n2, built 1912, Consortium Marocain, Rabat
 4 Decauville, Ct-n2, built 1912, Ecole de Ch. de F. f. Ch. de Fer Militaires du Maroc
 1 Decauville, Ct-n2, built 1914, Gouvernement Cherifien, Maroc f.
 1 Decauville, Ct-n2, built 1917, Ecole de Ch. de F. f. Ch. de Fer Militaires du Maroc
 6 Decauville, Ct-n2, built 1915–1920, Ecole de Ch. de F. f. Ch. de Fer du Maroc Oriental
 3 Decauville, C´C-n4, built 1914–1916, Ecole de Ch. de F. f. Marnia–Taourirt, Maroc
 27 Decauville, C´C-n4, built 1917–1922, Ecole de Chemins de Fer f. Maroc No 6012–6017
 8 Decauville, 1C+C1-h4, built 1927–1928, Regie des Ch. de Fer f. Guercif–Midelt
 1 Decauville, 1C+C1-n4, built 1927, Regie des Ch. de Fer f. Guercif–Midelt

Jung

 3 Jung, Bt-n2, built 1911–1912 Consortium Marocain
 1 Jung, Bt-n2, built 1912, Leipziger & Co, f. Morocco

Orenstein & Koppel

 1 Orenstein & Koppel, Bt-n2, built 1909, Massanet, Marokko
 2 Orenstein & Koppel, Bt-n2, built 1913, Casablanca, Marokko
 2 Orenstein & Koppel, Ct-n2, built 1913, Schneider & Co, f. Marokko
 1 Orenstein & Koppel, Ct-n2, built 1913, Schneider & Co, f. Marokko
 2 Orenstein & Koppel, Ct-n2, built 1914, Perchot, Marokko f. CF Militaires

Schwartzkopff

 Schwartzkopff, 1C+C1 petroleo–electrique Prototype, built 1931 Regie des. Chemins de Fer No 7000

Societe Alsacienne

 12 Societe Alsacienne, Et-n2, built 1921, C.F. Maroc

Weidknecht

 5 Weidknecht, 2Ct-n2, built 1912, C.F. Casablanca–Rabat
 5 Weidknecht, 2Ct-n2, built 1912, C.F. Marnia–Taourirt
 19 Weidknecht, 2Ct-n2, built 1913, Ch. de F. Militaires du Maroc

See also 
 Baldwin Class 10-12-D
 History of rail transport in Morocco
 Narrow-gauge railways in former Spanish Morocco
 War Department Light Railways

References 
Pascal Bejou & Lue Raynard & Jean Pierre Verges Larrouy: Les Chemins de Fer de la France d´Outre Mer. Volume 2 L´Afrique du Nord / Le Transsaharien 
E.D.Brant: Railways in North Africa 
A.E.Durrant, A.A.Jorgensen, C.P.Lewis: Steam in Africa 
Klaus Fricks, Roland Bude, Martin Murray: O&K Steam Locomotives Works List 1892–1945 
Bernhard Schmeiser: Krauss-Lokomotiven 
Unpublished locomotive builder lists ( mostly originally compiled by Dr. Ing. Bernhard Schmeiser, and added with later obtained supplementary information ):
American Locomotive Company ( ALCo ) Works List ( Harward Business School copy 1948 )
Anjubault / Corpet Louvet Works List
Baldwin Works List ( copy 1833–1956 compiled from original Baldwin order list )
Batignolles Châtillon, Nantes, St. Joseph Works List
Borsig Works List
A.Cail Works List
Carels Works List
Chrzanów Works List
Couillet Works List
Decauville Works List
Elsässische Maschinen-bau Ges. / Societe Alsacienne de Construction Mecaniques Belfort, Graffenstaden, Mulhouse Works List
Esslingen Works List
Falcon Works List
Fives Lille Works List
Gouin / Batignolles Works List
Henschel Works List
Jung Works List
Kerr Stuart & Co, LD Works List by Frank Jux 1991
J.A.Maffei Works List
La Meuse Works List
Etablissement A. Pinguely Works List
Schneider & Cie, Le Creusot Works List
Schwartzkopff ( BMAG ) Works List
Tubize Works List
Weidknecht et Compagnie Works List
Several articles published in several railway magazines.

External links 
 Morocco Military Railways illustrated

History of rail transport in Morocco
600 mm gauge railways in Morocco
500 mm gauge railways in Morocco